The Minuteman Library Network (MLN), founded in 1984, is a consortium of 41 public and academic libraries in the MetroWest and southern Middlesex County areas of eastern Massachusetts, US that share resources, patrons and services. The Network has over 6 million items and over 680,000 cardholders. Resources are shared. People who live, work, or study in Massachusetts are eligible for a card, which can be used to borrow items from Minuteman libraries.

Libraries

Public Libraries

 Acton Memorial Library
 Robbins Library, Arlington
 Ashland Public Library
 Bedford Free Public Library
 Belmont Public Library
 Public Library of Brookline
 Cambridge Public Library
 Concord Free Public Library
 Dedham Public Library
 Dover Town Library
 Framingham Public Library
 Franklin Public Library
 Holliston Public Library
 Cary Memorial Library, Lexington
 Lincoln Public Library
 Maynard Public Library
 Medfield Public Library
 Medford Public Library
 Medway Public Library
 Millis Public Library
 Morse Institute Library, Natick
 Bacon Free Library, Natick
 Needham Free Public Library
 Newton Free Library
 Morrill Memorial Library, Norwood
 Sherborn Public Library
 Somerville Public Library (Central Library, East Branch, West Branch)
 Randall Library, Stow
 Goodnow Library, Sudbury
 Waltham Public Library
 Watertown Free Public Library
 Wayland Free Public Library
 Wellesley Free Library
 Weston Public Library
 Westwood Public Library
 Winchester Public Library
 Winn Memorial Library, Woburn

Academic libraries

 Dean College, E. Ross Anderson Library, Franklin
 Framingham State University, Henry Whittemore Library
 Lasell College, Brennan Library, Newton
 Pine Manor College, Annenberg Library, Chestnut Hill
 Regis College Library, Weston

Former members

 Massachusetts Bay Community College, Perkins Library/Learning Resource Center, Wellesley & Framingham (moved to HELM)
 Mount Ida College, Wadsworth Learning Resource Center, Newton (closed 2018)
 Newbury College, Brookline, MA (closed 2019)

See also
 Cape Libraries Automated Materials Sharing (CLAMS)
 CW MARS (Central/Western Massachusetts Automated Resource Sharing)
 Merrimack Valley Library Consortium (MVLC)
 North of Boston Library Exchange (NOBLE)
 Old Colony Library Network (OCLN)
 SAILS Library Network

References

External links
 The Minuteman Library Network
 Bacon Free Library in South Natick

Library consortia in Massachusetts
1984 establishments in Massachusetts